The Siege of Maghas was the largest battle during the Mongol invasions of the North Caucasus, which was fought between the Mongol Empire and its allies and the Durdzuketi and the Kingdom of Alania. The historic capital of the Alans and Durdzuks, whose location is strongly debated, was besieged for 3 months, until it eventually fell to the Mongols, who destroyed it afterwards. This resulted in the capitulation and eventual destruction of the Kingdom of Alania and the Principality of Durdzuketi as well as the mass migration of Durdzuks and Alans into the mountains.

Background

Mongol invasion of Circassia 

In 1236, Ögedei Khan sent a large army consisting of more than 200,000 under the command of Batu Khan (along with other commdanders) to the North Caucasus to help Subutai in conquering the region. Goal of the Mongols was the capture and destruction of Maghas and the subjugation of the North Caucasian tribes.
The army arrived in the medieval Circassian kingdom Zichia, where the ruler of the state, Tuqar, was killed in battle in autumn of 1237, thus allowing the establishment of a pro-Mongol administration of the region. In the meanwhile, an army led by Subutai and others was sent to the "Land of the Ases" (Alania and Durdzuketi).

Alan/Durdzuk campaign in Circassia 
With the establishment of the pro-Mongol administration in Circassia, Khasi I, the ruler of Alania and Durdzuketi, sent a request to the governors, asking for the status of strapaty of Alania in Circassia, to which the refused. This led to Khour's I campaign in Circassia, in which he fought the Mongol administration.

Prelude

Start of the Mongol campaign in Alania 
In winter of 1238, the army which was stationed in Circassia, now invaded Alania. It ravaged the western regions of Alania, today's Karachay-Cherkessia. In November of 1239, the army arrived in Maghas.

Boturcha rebellion 
Before the start of the main Mongol invasion, the ruler of the village Boturcha, prince Botur (from the Dishniy clan of Chechnya, known as "Ela Botur" in Chechen and "Ele Badur" in the Chinese chronicle Yuan-Shi, conducted secret negotiations with the Mongol Empire, in which he discussed an independent state under his rule. At the start of the Mongol campaign in 1238, he and his family, such as his 2 brothers Matarsha and Utszorbu Khan came to Möngke Khan and expressed their obedience, thus declaring a rebellion against Khasi I, after which he sent an army led by his brother Matarsha along with other family members to Maghas in order to help the Mongols in besieging the city. This decision was supported by most of the Dishniy clan, especially Botur's family.

The siege 
The rebellious Dishniy  army, led by Matarsha and his relatives, was sent to Maghas in order to help the Mongols in besieging the city. In November of 1239, the siege began. By the start of the siege, Khour I had not arrived from his campaign in Circassia.

The inhabitants of “M-k-s”, says Juvaini, “were as numerous as ants and locusts, and the surrounding area was so densely covered with swamps and forests that a snake could not possibly crawl through.

The princes together surrounded the city from different sides, and first made a street wide enough for three or four chariots to pass on each side, and then material tools were placed against its walls. According to the Chinese chronicle "Yuan-Shi", Maghas was surrounded by swamps and huge dense forests that "It was difficult for the wind to get through". Because of this, the Mongols cut down the forests and paved roads for the army to get around easier, after which the Mongol army (among whom was Matarsha, whose army was in the vanguard) began the siege.

Not long after the siege began, Khour and his army arrived from Circassia. He drove a part of the Mongol army away and fought himself through enemy lines, until he managed to enter the city, after which he fortified himself in there.

Despite the support of the Dishniy clan towars Botur's rebellion, there were also many people from the Dishniy clan who opposed Botur, among them being his niece and the wife of Khour I, Esirat, who, during the siege, expected a child. She left the city through a secret passage known as the Bass gorge, and fled to the Cheberloy region, south east Chechnya, where she gave birth to Khour's only son, prince Chakh, sometimes also referred to as Chakhig.

The defence of Maghas was fierce. Regularly, there were attempts to take the city by storm, however all of them failed. At this point, the siege had been going on for 3 months. In January of 1240, the Mongol commanders Batu Khan, Kadan, Güyük and Möngke Khan ordered one, this time, large assault on the city. The Mongols first began by shelling with siege weapons for a long time, after which the Mongols used siege ladders to climb the walls. Matarsha also participated in the capture of the city. During the assault, two arrows hit him, but he continued the attack. To reduce casualties, the Mongols put prisoners of war at the front. Then, the troops at the front began shouting "The city has fallen!", to increase the moral of the Mongol army. After a short battle inside the city, the Mongols, after three months of siege, finally captured the city, after which it was destroyed.

Aftermath 
After the fall of Maghas, Batu Khan sent a report to Ögedei Khan, saying "By the power of the Eternal Sky and the greatness of the sovereign and uncle, we destroyed the city of Meget (Maghas) and subjugated eleven countries and peoples to your righteous power, and intending to turn the golden reins to the house, we decided to arrange a farewell feast."

Civilian deaths and the destruction of Maghas 
After the fall of Maghas, the Mongols plundered and destroyed it, killing many civilians in the process. The "Book of Victories" talks about 270,000 civilian deaths, however, since this number isn't mentioned in Mongol/Chinese sources, and especially since this number was mentioned 150 years after the siege, this figure is strongly exaggerated.

According to Chechen folklore, the Mongols killed the older population of Maghas, in order to erase the history of the Nakh people.

Ghulariy S'angarsh 
After the fall of Maghas, the Mongols invaded, and, after a fierce and brutal battle, captured the Alan city Ghulariy S'angarsh, which was the religious center of Alania and Durdzuketi.

Capitulation of Khasi I 
The fall and destruction of Maghas broke the elderly king Khasi I, who now recognized the dominion of the Mongols, for which he and his son Atachi received gifts.

In a treaty signed between the two sides, Khasi had to:

 Pay annual tribute to the Mongols.
 Send his oldest son, Atachi, to serve in the Mongol army.
 Send a detachment of around 1,000 men to serve in the Mongol army.

Khasi also accompanied the Mongols in some of their campaigns until his death one year later in 1241.

The actions and later life of the legendary Chechen king Khasi I corresponds to the historical personality "Khusy Khan", mentioned in the Chinese chronicle Yuan Shi. In there, it is written, that "Khan Khusy, ruler of the land of the Ases (Alans and Durdzuks)" submitted to Ögedei Khan.

Reconstruction of Maghas and its 2nd destruction 
After its destruction, under Mongol rule, the city was rebuilt again. During the Timurid invasions of Simsir, after having ravaged the region Nokhchiy-Are, central Chechnya, Timur gave the order to destroy the city Maghas again, which he, after a fierce battle, succeeded in. According to Amin Anguni, the destruction of Maghas is the reason behind Makham's surrender.

Insurgency in Durdzuketi and the fate of Khasi I 
Already right after the capitulation, unhappy with his father's decision, Khour I raised an army and rebelled against the Mongol Empire. The uprising was crushed in 1252, following his defeat during the battle of Sadoy-Lam and his assassination by his enemies.

See also 

 Mongol invasions of Durdzuketi
 Botur
 Maghas
 Timurid invasions of Simsir
 Khasi I
 Khour I
 Chakhig

Notes

References

Bibliography 
 

Battles involving Chechnya
History of Chechnya
Battles involving Ingushetia
Battles involving the Alans
13th-century conflicts
History of Ingushetia